Jeremy Poolman is a British novelist, biographer and artist. His first novel, Interesting Facts about the State of Arizona, won the 1997 Commonwealth Writers' Prize, best first book, UK.

He studied at University College School, and Oxford Brookes University.
His work has appeared in The Guardian.
He lives in Cornwall.

Works
Interesting Facts about the State of Arizona, Faber and Faber, 1996,  
Audacity's Song, Faber and Faber, 1998,  
My Kind of America, Bloomsbury, 2000,  
Skin, Bloomsbury, 2001, 

Non-Fiction
A Wounded Thing Must Hide: In Search of Libbie Custer, Bloomsbury, 2002,  
Gypsy Jem Mace: Being One Man's Search for His Forgotten Famous Ancestor Andre Deutsch, 2008,  
The Road of Bones: A Journey to the Dark Heart of Russia, Simon & Schuster, Limited, 2011,

References

External links
Author's website
2011 Surrey Heath Literary Festival

20th-century British novelists
21st-century British novelists
Living people
Alumni of Oxford Brookes University
People educated at University College School
British male novelists
20th-century British male writers
21st-century British male writers
Year of birth missing (living people)